Craneiobia is a genus of gall midges in the family Cecidomyiidae. There are at least two described species in Craneiobia. They create tube-like galls on leaves of Cornus plants.

Species
These two species belong to the genus Craneiobia:
 Craneiobia corni (Giraud, 1863) c g
 Craneiobia tuba (Stebbins, 1910) i b
Data sources: i = ITIS, c = Catalogue of Life, g = GBIF, b = Bugguide.net

References

Further reading

 
 
 
 
 

Cecidomyiinae
Articles created by Qbugbot
Cecidomyiidae genera